In enzymology, an alpha-N-acetylgalactosaminide alpha-2,6-sialyltransferase is an enzyme that catalyzes the chemical reaction

CMP-N-acetylneuraminate + glycano-1,3-(N-acetyl-alpha-D-galactosaminyl)-glycoprotein  CMP + glycano-(2,6-alpha-N-acetylneuraminyl)-(N-acetyl-D-galactosaminyl)- glycoprotein

Thus, the two substrates of this enzyme are CMP-N-acetylneuraminate and glycano-1,3-(N-acetyl-alpha-D-galactosaminyl)-glycoprotein, whereas its 3 products are CMP, glycano-(2,6-alpha-N-acetylneuraminyl)-(N-acetyl-D-galactosaminyl)-, and glycoprotein.

This enzyme belongs to the family of transferases, specifically those glycosyltransferases that do not transfer hexosyl or pentosyl groups. The systematic name of this enzyme class is CMP-N-acetylneuraminate:glycano-1,3-(N-acetyl-alpha-D-galactosaminyl)-glycoprotein alpha-2,6-N-acetylneuraminyltransferase. This enzyme participates in o-glycan biosynthesis and glycan structures - biosynthesis 1.

References

EC 2.4.99
Enzymes of unknown structure